Theoretical Medicine and Bioethics: Philosophy of Medical Research and Practice is a bimonthly peer-reviewed medical journal covering bioethics and the philosophy of medicine with a more theoretical outlook than other journals in this area. It was established in 1980 as Metamedicine and was renamed Theoretical Medicine in 1983, obtaining its current name in 1998. It is published by Springer Nature and offered at a reduced rate to members of the American Society for Bioethics and Humanities. The editors-in-chief are Lynn Jansen (Oregon Health & Science University) and Daniel Sulmasy (Georgetown University). According to the Journal Citation Reports, the journal has a 2018 impact factor of 0.789.

References

External links

Bimonthly journals
English-language journals
Springer Science+Business Media academic journals
Bioethics journals
Publications established in 1980